Myrtle Avenue may refer to:

Streets
 Myrtle Avenue, Queens, New York City
 Myrtle Avenue, Hounslow, close to Heathrow Airport

New York City Subway stations
Myrtle Avenue (BMT Jamaica Line), aka Myrtle Avenue–Broadway and serving the  trains
Myrtle Avenue (BMT Fourth Avenue Line), now closed
Myrtle Avenue (BMT Lexington Avenue Line), demolished
Court Street–Myrtle Avenue (BMT Fulton Street Line), demolished
BMT Myrtle Avenue Line, the remainder of the Myrtle Avenue elevated

Long Island Rail Road
Myrtle Avenue station (LIRR Evergreen Branch), demolished
Myrtle Avenue station (LIRR Bay Ridge Branch), removed